William Murray of Tullibardine (1510–1562) was a Scottish landowner.

He was a son of William Murray and Margaret Stewart. His mother was a daughter of John Stewart, 1st Earl of Atholl, and Eleanor Sinclair. His father rebuilt Tullibardine Chapel and sent hart horns from Tullibardine to Edinburgh for the costumes of "wild men" at the tournament of the Wild Knight and the Black Lady. He was killed at the battle of Flodden in 1513.

He died in 1562.

Marriage and children
Murray married Katherine Campbell of Glenorchy, daughter of Sir Duncan Campbell of Glenorchy (d. 1513) and Margaret Moncreiffe. Their children included:
 Annabell Murray, who married John Erskine, Earl of Mar (died 1572). She looked after the young James VI and Prince Henry at Stirling Castle.
 William Murray of Tullibardine (died 1583), father of John Murray, 1st Earl of Tullibardine
 Catherine Murray, who married Robert Murray of Abercairny
 Margaret Murray, who married Robert Bruce of Clackmannan.
 Jean Murray, who married James Henderson of Fordell

Lady Clackmannan and Lady Abercairny were dames of honour in the household of Prince Henry at Stirling.

References

1510 births
1562 deaths